Z13 may refer to:
 Akiachak Airport FAA LID
 Z13 torpedo, an electric heavy torpedo of the French Navy
 Small nucleolar RNA Z13/snr52, a non-coding RNA molecule
 German destroyer Z13 Erich Koellner, a Type 1934A destroyer built for the German Navy in the late 1930s
 New South Wales Z13 class locomotive, a class of steam locomotive built for and operated by the New South Wales Government Railways of Australia
 HMCS Renard (Z13)
 IBM z13 (microprocessor), a microprocessor chip used in mainframe computers.